Heliocarpus americanus is a tropical tree native to Central America, and native throughout Mexico. It is sometimes called majaguillo or majagua. It bears pinkish-brown flowers in December and January.

References

Grewioideae
Trees of Belize
Trees of Costa Rica
Trees of El Salvador
Trees of Guatemala
Trees of Honduras
Trees of Mexico
Trees of Panama
Trees of Venezuela
Trees of Bolivia
Trees of Colombia
Trees of Ecuador
Trees of Peru
Trees of Argentina
Trees of Paraguay
Plants described in 1753
Taxa named by Carl Linnaeus